The San Bernardino County 200 is a discontinued   NASCAR Camping World Truck Series race held at Auto Club Speedway in Fontana, California. It was first held in 1997, the year Auto Club Speedway opened, and last held in 2009. The race had been held as the second race of the Truck Series season since 2005, but was removed from the schedule after 2009 in order to save teams money in travel costs, no longer forcing them to travel from east coast to west coast for a race.

Race history

2001
The 2001 event, won by Ted Musgrave (with Jack Sprague clinching that year's Truck Series title), featured a last-minute driver change after the practice sessions. Because it was held as part of CART Marlboro 500 weekend, Phillip Morris (manufacturer of Marlboro) officials ejected the then-16 year old Kyle Busch, driving for Roush Racing after the practice session for the Truck Series event, citing an interpretation of the 1998 Tobacco Master Settlement Agreement that prohibited any person under 18 years of age (the federal smoking age at the time) from participating in events sponsored by tobacco companies; Busch was replaced by Tim Woods III for the rest of the race. For the 2002 season, NASCAR set a minimum age limit of 18 across all top three national series, partially because Winston was the series sponsor of its premier NASCAR Cup Series at the time.

2008
No qualifying segment took place. The field was set by owners points; Ron Hornaday Jr. started in first place. The race was dominated by Toyota; Daytona truck race runner-up Kyle Busch won the race in the No. 51 Toyota followed by Todd Bodine, Johnny Benson Jr., and Terry Cook in second, third, and fourth respectively in their Toyotas. Between Busch, Bodine, and Benson, Toyota led 79 out of 100 laps in the race; eight out of nine Toyotas in the field finished in the top 13. Ron Hornaday, Jr. led 15 laps and finished in fifth place; the highest-finishing place for Chevrolet in the race. Travis Kvapil led one lap and finished 7th in his No. 09 Ford. Dennis Setzer, in his No. 18 Dodge, led 3 laps and finished 16th.

2009
Kyle Busch, last year's winner, won the pole. With Johnny Benson starting second, two Toyota Tundras started at the front row followed by two Chevrolet Silverados driven by rookie Ricky Carmichael and Ron Hornaday in the second row. Mike Harmon fails to qualify. Busch led the opening laps. First caution: Mike Skinner taps into Brian Scott, sending Scott to the outside wall before the start/finish line. Lap 35, Norm Benning (No. 57) ran out of fuel, stopping his racing truck away from the backstretch to prevent a caution. Lap 45, second caution came out due to engine problems of the No. 25 of Terry Cook. Lap 50, halfway, Busch continued to lead laps and pull away from the field. Lap 86, green flag pit stops ensue; Mike Bliss (No. 40) ran out of fuel, but was able to make to pit road. Lap 90, Busch pits and took fuel only; David Starr took fuel only in his pitstop, also, moved up in positions as a result. Lap 96, Tayler Malsam (No. 81) ran out of fuel; no caution. Kyle Busch, with a ten-second lead, won race for the second time in a row; his tenth career truck win. Busch led 95 of 100 laps. Daytona truck race winner Todd Bodine finishes in second place, also, for the second time in a row. David Starr finished 4th. Rookie Ricky Carmichael finishes in 8th place.

Past winners

2006: Race extended due to a green–white–checker finish.
2008: Race postponed from Friday night to Saturday afternoon due to rain.

Multiple winners (drivers)

Multiple winners (teams)

Manufacturer wins

References

External links
 

Former NASCAR races
NASCAR Truck Series races